Park Jin-soo (born March 1, 1987) is a South Korean football player who currently plays for Chungju Hummel. His younger brother, Park Hyung-jin, is also a football player.

Club statistics

References

External links

jsgoal

 

1987 births
Living people
South Korean footballers
South Korean expatriate footballers
Hokkaido Consadole Sapporo players
Gyeongnam FC players
Chungju Hummel FC players
J2 League players
K League 1 players
K League 2 players
South Korean expatriate sportspeople in Japan
Expatriate footballers in Japan
Korea University alumni
Association football midfielders